Mata-e-Jaan Hai Tu is a Pakistani drama serial directed by Mehreen Jabbar, based on a novel of the same name written by Farhat Ishtiaq. It was originally aired on Hum TV from  2 March 2012 to 22 June 2012. The drama follows the lives of two Columbia University students, Haniya Sajjad (Sarwat Gilani) and Ibad Uzair (Adeel Hussain).

Plot

Haniya Sajjad a.k.a. 'Hani' (Sarwat Gilani) and Ibad Uzair a.k.a. 'Aabi' (Adeel Hussain) meet as students at Columbia University, New York.  Haniya has lost her parents and lives with her grandmother. Haniya and Ibad fall in love. Ibad, while on a trip back home, informs his parents about this relationship. His father, Uzair (Javed Sheikh), makes it clear that he will never accept it. As a dutiful son, Ibad decides to forget his love and marry the girl his father chose. He unwillingly gets engaged to his cousin following his father's insistence.

However, when Ibad returns to the US, Haniya is about to lose her grandmother and is left distraught. Haniya's grandmother asks him to marry her as her last wish, so she doesn't have to worry about Haniya. Haniya's grandmother dies a day after Ibad and Haniya's wedding. After spending some time with Haniya, Ibad visits Pakistan to break the news to his parents. Uzair explodes in anger and, ignoring his wife Hajra's (Hina Khawaja Bayat) pleas, announces that Ibad is no longer part of the family.

A saddened Ibad, on the way to the airport, rings up Haniya and tells her what has happened. To comfort him, Haniya promises that she will go to Pakistan and gain his father's forgiveness.

Deviations from the novel

Adapting her novel for the television screen, Farhat Ishtiaq has added a new sub-plot and fleshed out some of her original characters. In the TV series, Haniya and Ibad's love story is interwoven with a plot focusing on a married couple, Yamina (Sanam Saeed) and Adam (Junaid Khan). Ibad's best friend Adeel is a minor character in the novel but his role has been extended for the TV series. He is played onscreen by Ahsan Khan.

Cast

 Sarwat Gillani as Haniya Ibad Uzair
 Adeel Hussain as Ibad Uzair 
 Javed Sheikh as Uzair Farooq
 Hina Khawaja Bayat as Hajra Uzair
 Sanam Saeed as Yamina 
 Junaid Khan as Adam
 Ahsan Khan as Adeel
 Sajida Syed as Mama Jani, Haniya's paternal grandmother
 Humaira Zaheer as Haniya's mother
 Rajnish Jaiswal as Shoaib
 Raju Jamil as Haniya's uncle
 Shaz Khan as Vicky

Reception

The drama has received positive reviews from critics who have praised the story and its execution by director Mehreen Jabbar. TVKahani in its review gave it 3 out of 5 stars: "Over all, Mata-e-Jaan is a decent show, but falls thanks to the great expectations everyone had from it. The serial would’ve been much better, had they paid more attention to the principal cast, and twitched things a little. This isn’t a must watch, but it does have its own sweet moments." The cinematography has also been very well received: "The execution of the scenes is smooth, like the slides that effortlessly slip into place to form a beautiful portrait. That brings us to another reason why this drama is a must watch."

Accolades

Broadcasts
 Mata-e-Jaan Hai Tu originally premiered on Hum TV from 2 March 2012 to 22 June 2012.
 Rebroadcast as Mata-e-Jaan Hai Tu on Hum Sitaray in Pakistan.
 Broadcast as Tu Hai Meri Jaan on Rishtey in Europe.
 Broadcast as عشق حیاتی on MCB Bollywood in the Middle East.
 Broadcast as Meri Jaan Hai Tu on Zindagi TV in India.
 Broadcast as Mata-e-Jaan Hai Tu on Hum TV Europe and Hum Masala Europe in U.K
 Since mid-2020, it is available for streaming on Hum TV's Official YouTube Channel.

References

External links
 Hum TV's official website

Hum TV original programming
Urdu-language television shows
2012 Pakistani television series debuts
2012 Pakistani television series endings
Mehreen Jabbar's directions
Television series based on the novels of Farhat Ishtiaq